Basware Corporation (founded 1985) is a Finnish software company selling enterprise software for financial processes, purchase to pay and financial management. The company has operations in more than 70 countries worldwide. Basware’s markets include Nordic countries, Europe, North America and Asia Pacific. The company has its own subsidiaries in Scandinavia, Western Europe and the United States. Additionally, Basware has over 70 value added resellers in Europe.

History

1985–1999
Basware was founded in 1985. It was then a Finnish subsidiary of an American corporation and it was called Baltic Accounting Systems.

The Finnish management team (Hannu Vaajoensuu, Ilkka Sihvo, Kirsi Eräkangas, Antti Pöllänen and Sakari Perttunen) bought the company in 1990.

In 1992, Basware introduced their first Financial Management software. In 1997, the company introduced their first Invoice Processing software. It contained Scan & Capture Workflow for Invoices (e-Flow). The first international customer was in 1999, in Sweden.

2000–
In 2000, the company had a public listing on the Helsinki Stock Exchange. They also introduced the first electronic invoicing, archiving and procurement products and intelligent OCR and got their first customers in Norway, Denmark and the Netherlands. Between 2001–2002, there were expansion into Central Europe, UK, USA and Australia.

In 2005, Basware acquired Norway-based Iocore and Finnish Trivet Software, the following year they acquired Finnish Analyste and in 2007, UK-based Digital Vision Technologies Ltd.

In 2008, Basware acquired Norwegian-based Contempus AS, and the next year Itella's Norwegian invoice automation solution business, and TAG Services Pty Ltd in Australia.

In 2010, Basware acquired TNT Post's Connectivity operations. Two years later, it acquired German e-Invoice network First Businesspost (1stbp) GmbH, and network and e-Invoicing business of leading Benelux operator Certipost.

In 2013, there were over 60 million transactions in the Basware Commerce Network. Basware acquired Certipost, the leading e-invoice operator in the Benelux.

In 2015, Basware acquired Procserve, a leading e-procurement operator in the UK, and the following year they acquired Verian, a leading e-procurement operator in the US.

In 2020, Basware introduced InvoiceReady, a business unit that provides small and medium-sized businesses with its procure-to-pay technology.

In April 2022, Sapphire BidCo, a company owned by a consortium including Accel and KKR submitted a voluntary public cash tender offer for all shares of Basware. The offer was successful, and the company was acquired by Sapphire BidCo and delisted from Nasdaq Helsinki in November 2022.

Products
Basware’s products are packaged composite applications (PCA) that are intended to interact with and complement the functionalities of existing systems, such as enterprise resource planning (ERP) systems, used across the organization to support daily processes. The company's software automates procurement, invoice receiving and invoice processing and can also be implemented as a software as a service (SaaS) delivery. These technologies are known as Cloud-Invoicing.

References

Software companies of Finland
Procurement
Financial software companies
Companies based in Espoo
Financial services companies established in 1985
1985 establishments in Finland
Companies formerly listed on Nasdaq Helsinki